Blue Lagoon Water Park is an indoor waterpark near Canaston Bridge, Narberth in Pembrokeshire, Wales.  Blue Lagoon is located in the Bluestone National Park Resort. It was opened in 2008.

Features
The subtropical waterpark features a beach-style large swimming pool with a wave machine, spa pools, river rapids ride, two water flumes, an "easy-going" lazy river that takes you outside, a pirates’ shipwreck and a separate wet play area for children in the water cove.

Blue Lagoon Water Park building is 90m long by 40m wide.

Blue Lagoon is only available for residents of Bluestone Resort who have "unlimited access".

The waterpark is heated with locally-sourced biomass. In 2022, it was rated "excellent" by the Royal Life Saving Society UK.

The park was closed for over a year during the COVID-19 pandemic in Wales, re-opening to only residents of Bluestone resort in April 2021, by April 2022 the water park had retained the exclusive policy. The move was criticised by locals.

Swimming lessons may also be conducted at the waterpark, and seasonal pool parties.

Construction
The roof structure is constructed of timber frame, covered in wood tiles and two layers of transparent plastic and shaped like an upturned Cleddau coracle.

References

External links
Official website

Water parks in the United Kingdom
Buildings and structures in Pembrokeshire
Tourist attractions in Pembrokeshire
2008 establishments in Wales